Liang Hongyu (1102–1135) was a Chinese general of the Song Dynasty. She became famous during the Jin–Song wars against the Jurchen-led Jin Dynasty. Her real given name was lost in time. She was simply referenced in the official Chinese history books as "Lady Liang" (梁氏). Historical details of Liang's life are sketchy, but she was known to be the wife of Han Shizhong, a Song general known for resisting invaders from the Jin Dynasty together with Yue Fei and others, and to have commanded troops at the Battle of Huangtiandang using drums to coordinate the Song forces. Liang is presumed to have died of illness in the year 1135.

Since her death, several legendary tales have emerged of her life and exploits. These tales give her the name "Hongyu" (红玉), meaning "Red Jade".

Historical Liang Hongyu
There are scant details of the historical Liang Hongyu. Her birthday and birthplace are unknown, although some sources she was born in 1102 in what is today's Anhui Province. Her early life is unknown, but she was a singer (similar to a geisha) when she met Han Shizong in 1121 while performing his army. They married, and had at least one child.

Han Shizong was a general commanding Song troups against the Jin Dynasty, and Liang accompanied her husband on these campaigns. She is known to have participated at the Battle of Huangtiandang, where her use of flags and drums as signals led to a Song victory. When Han Shizong resigned after the execution of Yue Fei, Liang followed her husband into retirement. She is believed to have died of illness in 1135.

Legendary Liang Hongyu
Later legends about Liang significantly fleshed out details of her life and exploits. Liang's father was an army commander at the frontier, from where the Song Dynasty was increasingly threatened by the Jurchen-ruled Jin Dynasty. He taught her martial skills. Liang's feet were not bound. She was a master of martial arts. Several accounts stated she was a woman with incredible strength and was a master of archery.

At some point, she was forced to work as a female slave due to her father being punished for losing a critical battle. According to some historical accounts, her slave work might be similar to a modern-day woman wrestler. In the Song Dynasty, woman wrestling was a popular sport that even attracted the Song emperors to view woman wrestling in public matches. Most female wrestlers were dressed as males, wearing nothing but a loincloth during the match. This sport was completely banned in the Ming Dynasty since Ming era people felt it was indecent. Some modern historians argued this was the reason her position had been misinterpreted as prostitution by some historians in the Ming Dynasty.

At a certain point in her career, she met her husband, Han Shizhong, though accounts differ on exactly how they met. The most believable version is that she met Han at a banquet where she was entertaining the troops that Han led. Han had led his men in crushing a rebellion in southern China, and Han had personally arrested the rebel leader, Fang La. However, his superior stole his credit, much to Han's displeasure. Liang knew the truth and admired Han's victory. She saved enough money to pay her own redemption from slavery. After she was free, she became Han's second wife.

The Jurchens soon started the total invasion of the Song Dynasty. Han formed an army to fight the Jurchens and Liang worked as a general in her husband's army.

Battle of Huangtiandang

When the Jurchens once more invaded and attacked Hangzhou in 1129, shortly after the coup had been crushed, Liang and her husband led their forces to ambush the enemy army on their way back to Jin territory. Their troops were outnumbered and the Battle of Huangtiandang commenced. This was a series of naval battles fought on the Yangtze River. Liang made a plan by which she would direct the soldiers with her drums. When the battle started, the Song troops were pushed back by Jurchen troops due to superior numbers on the Jurchen side. With great courage, Liang threw her helmet and armour, beating the drums and led the charge into the enemy formation. This became the turning point of the battle. Chinese "Tiger Ships", which could spew fire with flame throwers, destroyed many Jin ships while Liang directed them with her drumming. The Jurchens were trapped for more than a month, before a traitor revealed a weakness in the Chinese encirclement and they escaped, but with heavy losses.

Later life
In 1135 Han was appointed jiedushi of Wuning Anhua (武寧安化軍節度使). Liang and her husband rebuilt the fortress of Chuzhou and increased its defence. They and their soldiers also worked on the rebuilding of houses and the planting of fields.

Legacy
Poetry was written in her honour, which contributed to her fame.

Together with Qin Liangyu, He Yufeng, and the legendary Hua Mulan, she is one of the most well-known female warriors in China.

References

Women in ancient Chinese warfare
12th-century Chinese people
Women in 12th-century warfare
Song dynasty generals
1135 deaths
1102 births
Chinese female generals
Jiedushi
Burials in Suzhou
Deified Chinese people
Chinese wrestlers
Female wrestlers